Fyodor Fyodorovich Luzhin (Russian: Федор Федорович Лужин) (died 1727) was a Russian geodesist and cartographer.

Fyodor Luzhin was first a student at the School for Mathematical and Navigational Sciences in Moscow and then in a geodesic class of the Naval Academy in St. Petersburg (until 1718). In 1719–1721, Luzhin took part in drawing a map of Kamchatka and Kuril Islands together with Ivan Yevreinov. In 1723–1724, he made surveys of different parts of East Siberia. In 1725–1727, Luzhin participated in the First Kamchatka Expedition led by Vitus Bering.

See also
Luzhin Bay

Year of birth missing
Explorers of Asia
Cartographers from the Russian Empire
Explorers from the Russian Empire
Russian geodesists
1727 deaths
18th-century geographers